E with acute (Э́ э́) is a letter used in Russian and Belarusian. It denotes a stressed Э. For example, in Russian, it can be used in the word э́тот, meaning 'this'. However, in Russian, the acute accent is mostly used in dictionaries and children’s books.

Cyrillic letters with diacritics